Three abrogative referendums on the electoral law were held in Italy on 21–22 June 2009. They were promoted by Mario Segni, Giovanni Guzzetta, Arturo Parisi, Antonio Martino and Daniele Capezzone. With a turnout of 23.31% / 23.84%, the referendums did not reach the necessary quorum of 50% voters, so were not valid.

The three questions were about giving the majority prize to the most voted list in the Chamber of Deputies (question 1, purple ballot) and in the Senate (question 2, yellow ballot) as opposed to the most voted coalition, as is the current law, and about preventing politicians from standing in multiple constituencies at the same time (question 3, green ballot).

The Promoting Committee and Democratic Party (PD) had proposed holding the referendums together with European Parliament elections, whereas The People of Freedom (PdL) as its main ally, the Lega Nord, opposed the referendums and answered that never, in Italian history, an election and a referendum were jointly celebrated.

Several PdL party officials had long supported the referendums, the main long-term goal of the PdL being to transform Italian politics into a two-party system. The PD saw the referendums as an opportunity to overcome its current political hard times and to divide the centre-right.

Results 
The referendums did not reach the quorum required by law for their validity.

First question 
Italian Chamber of Deputies — Abrogation of the connection between lists and of the attribution of the majority prize to a coalition of lists.

Second question 
Italian Senate — Abrogation of the connection between lists and of the attribution of the majority prize to a coalition of lists.

Third question 
Italian Chamber of Deputies — Abrogation of the possibility for a candidate to stand for election in more than one constituency.

References 

2009 elections in Italy
2009 referendums
Referendums in Italy
Electoral reform referendums
Electoral reform in Italy
June 2009 events in Europe